Belafonte at The Greek Theatre is a live double album by Harry Belafonte, released by RCA Victor in 1963. It was his last album to appear in Billboard's Top 40.

Track listing 
 "Look Over Yonder-Be My Woman Gal #1" – 4:42	 
 "Glory Manger" – 4:11	 
 "Shake That Little Foot" – 4:02	 
 "Windin' Road" (William Eaton) – 4:36	 
 "Hoedown Blues" – 2:40	 
 "Try To Remember" (Tom Jones, Harvey Schmidt) – 3:46	 
 "Why'n Why" (Woody Guthrie) – 3:19	 
 "Contemporary Dance" – 2:24	 
 "In My Father's House" – 3:12	 
 "Hayoshevet Baganim" (Nissan Cohen Hav-ron) – 2:30	 
 "Cruel War" – 3:23	 
 "Pig" – 1:43	 
 "Sailor Man" (Fred Hellerman, Fran Minkoff) – 3:03	 
 "Merry Minuet" (Sheldon Harnick) – 3:28	 
 "Boot Dance" – 3:23	 
 "Zombie Jamboree" (Traditional) – 16:45

Personnel 
 Harry Belafonte – vocals
 William Eaton – clavietta
 Ernie Calabria – guitar
 Jay Berliner – guitar
 John Cartwright – bass
 Percy Brice – drums
 Ralph MacDonald – percussion
Production notes:
 Orchestra and chorus conducted by Howard Roberts
 Orchestral arrangements by Hugo Montenegro
 Bob Bollard – producer, liner notes
 Bob Simpson – engineer
 Edwin Begley – tape mastering
 Jay Maisel – cover photo
 Garret-Howard – photography
 Wilson Miller – photography

Chart positions

References 

Harry Belafonte live albums
1964 live albums
RCA Records live albums
Albums recorded at the Greek Theatre (Los Angeles)
Albums conducted by Howard Roberts